Wicked Twister was an inverted roller coaster located at Cedar Point amusement park in Sandusky, Ohio, United States. Designed by Werner Stengel, it was a second-generation, double-twisting Impulse model manufactured by Intamin. Wicked Twister opened as the tallest and fastest inverted coaster in the world on May 5, 2002. It was retired by the park on September 6, 2021, closed on September 7, and gave over 16 million rides during its lifetime.

History
Construction on Wicked Twister began on October 15, 2001, shortly after Stadium Games, formerly known as the Aquarium, was razed. The new coaster was officially announced the following month, and its media day was held on May 2, 2002.

Billed as the tallest and fastest double-twisting impulse coaster ever built, Wicked Twister actually opened as the tallest and fastest inverted coaster in the world on May 5, 2002. It held both records until the opening of Legendary Twin Dragon at Chongqing Sunac Land in China in 2021. Additional supports were added to the ride's structure for the 2003 season. Two yellow supports were added to each spike to connect the track to the top of the main support structure.

In May 2021, park official Tony Clark implied in a series of tweets that Wicked Twister was going to be retired. This was confirmed on August 6, 2021, when Cedar Point officially announced the closure of Wicked Twister, scheduled for September 6, 2021. The ride then closed September 7, and on its last day of operation, park employees handed out "last launch" buttons to riders, sold limited-edition commemorative t-shirts, and gave away 16 "golden tickets" granting winners a spot on the last public train. Wicked Twister had accumulated over 16 million rides in 20 seasons of operation.

On November 3, 2021, Cedar Point announced that Wicked Twister would be demolished. Demolition and removal was completed on February 8, 2022.

Ride details
Both ends of the track were designed with 450-degree vertical twists, referred to as the front and rear towers, which differentiated Wicked Twister from other Impulse Coaster models from Intamin. The loading platform and linear induction motor (LIM) propulsion system sat between the two towers along a horizontal track section. The ride was built directly on Cedar Point Beach, and its entrance plaza was located in the former Aquarium location. The track was painted yellow with teal supports.

The ride featured one train that consisted of eight cars. Riders were arranged two across in two rows for a total of 32 riders. Wicked Twister's theme song was "The Winner" by the Crystal Method.

Layout

Linear induction motors propelled the train forward out of the station at  during the first launch, which carried the train approximately halfway up the front tower.

The train then made one more final pass through the station without any interaction from the LIM launch section and up the front spike. Subsequent passes through the station were met with the brakes being applied to slow the train slightly more each time until finally coming to rest.

See also
 The Flash: Vertical Velocity – similar coaster located at Six Flags Great America
 Possessed – similar coaster located at Dorney Park & Wildwater Kingdom
 Steel Venom – similar coaster located at Valleyfair

References

External links

 Cedarpoint.com - Official Wicked Twister page
 Wicked Twister Photo Gallery at The Point Online

Cedar Point
Roller coasters introduced in 2002
Roller coasters operated by Cedar Fair
Former roller coasters in Ohio
2002 establishments in Ohio
2021 disestablishments in Ohio